Théodore Bainconneau (25 November 1887 – 10 October 1972) was a French wrestler. He competed in the Greco-Roman lightweight event at the 1920 Summer Olympics.

References

External links
 

1887 births
1972 deaths
Olympic wrestlers of France
Wrestlers at the 1920 Summer Olympics
French male sport wrestlers
Place of birth missing